Brunot Island (also spelled Brunot's Island) is a  island in the Ohio River. It is officially part of the Marshall-Shadeland neighborhood of Pittsburgh, in Allegheny County, Pennsylvania in the United States.  It was named for Dr. Felix Brunot who settled the island with his extended family in the late 1700s.  The family entertained the Lewis and Clark Expedition on the island in August 1803.  The island is home to the Brunot Island Generating Station, a 315 MW fossil fuel power plant.

The Ohio Connecting Railroad Bridge crosses the Ohio River at the island. The island does not otherwise connect to the land, and all vehicular traffic must use a ferry to access the island. The employees of the power plant use a pedestrian walkway on the railroad bridge to go to work. The walkway is not accessible to the public.

From 1903 to 1914, the island was the home of Brunots Island Race Track.

Brunot Island Generating Station

Type: Fossil fuel; oil and natural gas
Net capacity: 315 MW (megawatts)
Began operation: 1972
Current owner: NRG Energy

Plants
Three oil-fired simple cycle peaking power plants
Total generating capacity: 53 MW
One natural-gas-fired combined cycle power plant
Total generating capacity: 262 MW

References

WPXI Report
Reliant Energy's website

External links
 Brunot Island
 Pittsburgh Neighborhood Profile: Brunot Island
 Pittsburgh Neighborhoods: History of Brunot Island
 We Take Brunot in the Morning!
 Airgun Accident
  Brunot Island Once Hosted Explorers, Automobile Races And Now, Lots Of Wildlife

Geography of Pittsburgh
River islands of Pennsylvania
Islands of the Ohio River
Islands of Allegheny County, Pennsylvania
NRG Energy